Park Yong-ju ( born 22 May 1994), better known by his stage name Yongzoo, is a South Korean singer and songwriter signed to Mostworks Entertainment. He debuted with the song "In Your Eyes" in May 2018.

Career

2012–2016
Park Yong-ju trained for three years at the entertainment agency SM Entertainment. He later became an associate member of the company's pre-debut training team SM Rookies, with the stage name "Yongju", although he did not get officially introduced. His only documented activity with the pre-debut team was a performance in "SM Town Week" in 2013 alongside the now-NCT members.

He participated as a contestant in a boy group survival reality show named Super Idol  (season 1 and 2), which is co-hosted by China's Anhui Satellite TV and South Korea's MBC Music TV. In the final round of the first season, his team "B Swan" won. In the final round of the second season, he became the first winner of the show and also won a debut quota as a member of a new boy group.

2017–present
In 2017, Park started to use the stage name Jhomie to launch songs. He collaborated with music composer Ferdy in "Ferdy's Project". They launched two songs in August 2017 and January 2018. The first single from "Ferdy's Project vol.1" was "See the Light", released in August 2017. In addition to participating the vocal part, Park also took part in the lyrical creation. In January 2018, they released "Ferdy's Project vol.2", with the single "At That Place", and Park again took part in singing and composing the track.

Park is signed to MostWorks Entertainment as a solo artist and debuted on 22 May 2018 under the stage name Yongzoo (용주).
 Since his debut, he has contributed to television soundtracks, including Are You Human? and The Third Charm.

In 2020, Park contributed the song "Sweet Home" to the soundtrack of the horror television series Sweet Home.

Discography

Extended plays

Singles

Other releases

Filmography

Notes

References

External links
 MostWorks Entertainment official website

Living people
1994 births
21st-century South Korean male  singers